George Crookshank (1680–1751)  was an Irish politician.

Crookshank was born in Dublin and educated at Trinity College, Dublin. He was MP for Kilmallock from 1797 to 1800.

References

Alumni of Trinity College Dublin
18th-century Irish politicians
Members of the Parliament of Ireland (pre-1801) for Belfast
Irish MPs 1790–1797
Irish MPs 1798–1800
Politicians from Dublin (city)